Baja is a district in south-western part of Bács-Kiskun County. Baja is also the name of the town where the district seat is found. The district is located in the Southern Great Plain Statistical Region.

Geography 
Baja District borders with Kalocsa District to the north, Jánoshalma District and Bácsalmás District to the east, the Serbian district of West Bačka to the south, Mohács District (Baranya County) and Szekszárd District (Tolna County) to the west. The number of the inhabited places in Baja District is 17.

Municipalities 
The district has 1 town, 1 large village and 15 villages.
(ordered by population, as of 1 January 2013)

The bolded municipality is city, italics municipality is large village.

Demographics

In 2011, it had a population of 66,501 and the population density was 66/km².

Ethnicity
Besides the Hungarian majority, the main minorities are the German (approx. 3,700), Croat (1,600), Roma (1,100), Serb (350) and Romanian (100).

Total population (2011 census): 66,501
Ethnic groups (2011 census): Identified themselves: 63,845 persons:
Hungarians: 56,380 (88.31%)
Germans: 3,685 (5.77%)
Croats: 1,632 (2.56%)
Gypsies: 1,092 (1.71%)
Others and indefinable: 1,056 (1.65%)
Approx. 3,000 persons in Baja District did not declare their ethnic group at the 2011 census.

Religion
Religious adherence in the county according to 2011 census:

Catholic – 36,891 (Roman Catholic – 36,793; Greek Catholic – 90);
Reformed – 2,598;
Evangelical – 315;
Orthodox – 95;
other religions – 1,789; 
Non-religious – 7,534; 
Atheism – 573;
Undeclared – 16,706.

Gallery

See also
List of cities and towns of Hungary

References

External links
 Postal codes of the Baja District

Districts in Bács-Kiskun County